Saida Adjoula Mosque is a mosque in Tunis. It is located in the north of the medina.

Localization 

This mosque is located at number 20, Saida Adjoula Street.

Etymology  
The mosque got its name from a saint, Saida Adjoula.

History 
The mosque was built in 1874 (1291 Hijri) under the reign of the Husainid dynasty, as mentioned by the commemorative plaque at the entrance.

References 

Mosques in the medina of Tunis
19th-century mosques